Senecio ovatus, common name wood ragwort,  is a perennial herbaceous plant belonging to the family Asteraceae.

Description
The stems are erect and hairless, while leaves are oblong, lanceolate and finely serrated. Flowers are light yellow. The flowering season is from July to September.

Distribution
Senecio ovatus is present in central Europe.

Habitat

Subspecies
Senecio ovatus (P. Gaertner, Meyer & Scherb.) Willd. subsp. ovatus
Senecio ovatus subsp. alpestris (Gaudin) Herborg

Gallery

References

Pignatti 1982, Flora d'Italia. Volume 3, Bologna, Edagricole, 1982, pag. 126
Biolib
Index synonymique de la flore de France
Senecio ovatus Flora Europaea (Royal Botanic Garden Edinburgh) Database
Senecio ovatus Global Compositae Checklist Database
Senecio ovatus EURO MED - PlantBase Checklist Database
Senecio ovatus IPNI Database
Senecio ovatus Tropicos Database

ovatus
Flora of Europe